"Lazy Henry" or "Lazy Heinz" is a German fairy tale collected by the Brothers Grimm in Grimm's Fairy Tales, number 164.  It was first added in the third edition.

It is Aarne-Thompson type 1430, Air Castles.

Synopsis
Henry was so lazy he minded his only task, driving a goat to pasture and back.  He married Fat Trina so she would drive both his and her goats.  Trina proposed trading the goats for a hive, which would not need tending.  They gather a pitcher of honey and discuss whether to get a gosling.  Trina wants a child to look after it; Henry says that children don't obey, any more than a servant does.  Trina goes to hit him with a stick and breaks the pitcher.  They agree that this way they do not have to look after the goose.

Allusions
Harry refers to The Wise Servant, Grimm tale number 162, with the complaint about a servant.

References

Grimms' Fairy Tales
ATU 1350-1439